Events from the year 1989 in Iran.

Incumbents
 Supreme Leader: Ruhollah Khomeini (until June 3), Ali Khamenei (starting June 4)
 President: Ali Khamenei (until August 3), Akbar Hashemi Rafsanjani (starting August 3)
 Prime Minister: Mir-Hossein Mousavi (until August 3)
 Vice President: Hassan Habibi (starting September 1)
 Chief Justice: Mohammad Yazdii (until June 30), Mahmoud Hashemi Shahroudi (starting June 30)

Events

3 August – Ali Khamenei left as the president of Iran.
3 June – Ruhollah Khomeini passes away and Ali Khamenei succeeds him the next day.

See also
 Years in Iraq
 Years in Afghanistan

References

 
Iran
Years of the 20th century in Iran
1980s in Iran
Iran